Tenali Ramakrishna is a 1956 Indian Telugu-language political drama film produced and directed by B. S. Ranga based on Ch. Venkataramaiah's stage play of the same name. Produced for the banner Vikram Productions, it stars Akkineni Nageswara Rao, N. T. Rama Rao, V. Nagayya, Bhanumathi Ramakrishna and Jamuna in key roles. Ranga handled the cinematography with his brother-in-law B. N. Haridas while P. G. Mohan edited the film. Viswanathan–Ramamoorthy composed the soundtrack and background score.

Written by Samudrala Sr., Kannadasan and Murugadasa, Tenali Ramakrishna narrates the story of the 14th century Telugu and Sanskrit poet and scholar of the same name, and his life as a member of the court of Krishnadevaraya, the king of the Vijayanagara Empire. Using his wits, Ramakrishna manages to save Krishnadevaraya from attacks by the Bahmani Sultanate, which tries to invade the Vijayanagara Empire. The rest of the film is about Ramakrishna's efforts to save Krishnadevaraya from courtesan Krishnasani, a spy, and convincing Emperor Babur against extending support to the Sultanate in the war.

Produced as a bilingual film shot simultaneously in the Telugu and Tamil languages with a slightly altered cast, Tenali Ramakrishna was filmed in and around Revathy Studios at Madras. It was released on 12 January 1956 to mixed reviews from critics who criticised the historical inaccuracies portrayed in the film. Tenali Ramakrishna was a commercial success, won the President's Silver medal for the Best Feature Film in Telugu and the All India Certificate of Merit for Best Feature Film at the 4th National Film Awards. Its Tamil version, titled Tenali Raman, featured Sivaji Ganesan as the protagonist and was released on 3 February 1956. Tenali Ramakrishna was later remade in Kannada as Hasyaratna Ramakrishna in 1982 by Ranga himself but it was a commercial failure.

Plot 
Ramakrishna is a poet and scholar in the Telugu and Sanskrit languages whose talent is not recognised in his hometown Tenali. To earn a living, he migrates to Hampi with his wife Kamala and son Madhava. On his way to Hampi, he stops at a Kali temple. He is initially terrified looking at the goddess' idol and the animal sacrifices made to please her. That night, Kali appears before him and grants a boon: he must choose either wisdom or wealth. Ramakrishna opts for both, which angers Kali. She warns him that he might end up as a Vikatakavi (clownish poet) whose wisdom is useful solely for entertaining others. Ramakrishna accepts this as a blessing and asks Kali to save him from further dangers. The goddess agrees and disappears.

Ramakrishna reaches Hampi and approaches Tatacharya, the royal priest of the Vijayanagara Empire, to find employment in the court of King Krishnadevaraya. Neither Tatacharya nor his assistants help him, and he leaves dejected. However, he finds an opportunity when Krishnadevaraya is unable to distribute 17 elephants among three brothers as instructed in their deceased father's will. Ramakrishna solves the problem and Krishnadevaraya appoints him as a member of court. With his wit and loyalty, Ramakrishna soon earns the respect of all the court's members with the exception of Tatacharya who sees him as a problem.

The Deccan sultanates of Berar—Ahmednagar, Bidar, Bijapur, and Golconda—decide to wage a war on the Vijayanagara empire with united military forces. They send Kanakaraju, a spy, to Hampi where he meets Ramakrishna, who happens to be a distant relative. A few days later, Kanakaraju tries to assassinate Krishnadevaraya and Tatacharya blames Ramakrishna for giving shelter to a spy. As Ramakrishna is about to be executed on the King's orders, he overhears a conversation between another spy and the court's astrologer. The spy bribes the astrologer to influence Krishnadevaraya to postpone the war on Bijapur so they have time to make proper preparations. Ramakrishna escapes and meets Prime Minister Timmarusu who helps him reveal the astrologer's intentions. The astrologer is killed and Tatacharya, who believed in him in good faith, is accused of trying to backstab the king. Ramakrishna intervenes and Tatacharya is saved, improving their relationship.

The Bahmani Sultanate then sends the courtesan Krishnasani to Hampi. With her acclaimed dancing skills, she manages to attract the attention of Krishnadevaraya, who finds himself besotted by her wit and sensuousness. He issues orders that anyone who enters his private chamber will be beheaded and spends time with Krishnasani for months. Timmarusu and Ramakrishna learn that the Sultans are planning to take advantage of the King's inaccessibility and will soon launch a combined attack on Hampi. Worried at the state of affairs, Ramakrishna ignores the King's order and enters his abode dressed as a woman, but he is ignored and expelled from the kingdom.

Meanwhile, Krishnadevaraya's wife Tirumala Devi falls seriously ill, and he finally realises his mistakes. Once the King is back at his palace, Ramakrishna manages to enter Krishnasani's chamber again, this time under the guise of a saint. He catches her red-handed with her gang of spies, and signals to the hidden soldiers to surround her. She kills herself preferring a dignified death. Ramakrishna wishes to leave for Delhi to convince Emperor Babur not to send his elephantry to support the Sultanate in the war.

Ramakrishna reaches Delhi and meets Babur in the guise of an aged fakir. He sings his praises until he empties all the gold coins Babur has. Babur invites him to his palace to gift him properly. Ramakrishna goes to Babur's palace. He introduces himself as one of the innocent citizens of the Vijayanagara empire who will suffer if Babur extends his support to the unjust Sultanate. Babur is convinced and calls his elephantry back. Dismayed at the sudden turn of events, the Sultanate calls off the war. Krishnadevaraya learns about Ramakrishna's efforts in stopping the war from Timmarusu. Remorseful, Krishnadevaraya invites Ramakrishna to rejoin the court; he gladly agrees.

Cast 

Male actors
Akkineni Nageswara Rao as Tenali Ramakrishna
N. T. Rama Rao as Krishnadevaraya
V. Nagayya as Timmarusu
Mukkamala as Tatacharya
Vangara Venkata Subbaiah as Appanna, Tatacharya's assistant
Master Venkateshwar as Madhava, Ramakrishna's son
Mikkilineni as Kanakaraju
Kamaraju as Babur

Female actors
Bhanumathi Ramakrishna as Krishnasani
Jamuna as Kamala, Ramakrishna's wife
R. Balasaraswathi Devi as Radha
Sandhya as Tirumala Devi
Lakshmikantha as a street dancer
Venkumamba as Ramakrishna's mother

Production

Development 
After the success of his first production venture Maa Gopi (1954), B. S. Ranga wished to produce and direct a historical film based on the life of the 14th century Telugu poet and scholar Tenali Ramakrishna, one of the Ashtadiggajas (a collective title given to the eight Telugu poets in the court of Krishnadevaraya, which literally translates as "eight great elephants"). He planned it as a bilingual film to be filmed simultaneously in the Telugu and Tamil languages but with a slightly altered cast. Ranga collaborated with Samudrala Sr., Kannadasan and Murugadasa on the basic script for both the versions. They decided to adapt Ch. Venkataramaiah's Kannada-language stage play Tenali Ramakrishna into the film, instead of following H. M. Reddy script for the 1941 Telugu directorial of the same name. Ranga titled the film Tenali Raman in Tamil.

Venkataramaiah's play was comical in nature, and focused on the life and times of Ramakrishna. Fearing it would fail to translate on-screen effectively, Samudrala and Kannadasan decided to incorporate political elements during the rule of Krishnadevaraya. While Samudrala focused on the administrative aspects of Krishnadevaraya, Kannadasan opted to "humanise" the king by writing scenes related to his personal life and preferences. Tenali Ramakrishna was filmed in and around Revathy Studios in Madras, due to the floors of Ranga's production company Vikram Studios still being under construction. V. S. Rangachari, the film's associate director, assisted Ranga in directing the Telugu version.

Cast and crew 
Ranga cast Akkineni Nageswara Rao to play Ramakrishna in Telugu, with Sivaji Ganesan replacing him in the Tamil
version.N. T. Rama Rao and V. Nagayya were signed to play Krishnadevaraya and his minister Timmarusu. Mukkamala played the role of Tatacharya, the kingdom's royal priest. He was replaced by M. N. Nambiar in the Tamil version.

Ranga approached Bhanumathi Ramakrishna to play Krishnasani. Initially disinterested, Bhanumathi accepted the offer because of Ranga's association as a cinematographer for films produced by her production company Bharani Pictures. Tenali Ramakrishna is the only film where Bhanumathi shared the screen with both Rama Rao and Nageswara Rao at once. Vangara Venkata Subbaiah, Sandhya, R. Balasaraswathi Devi, Jamuna, Lakshmikantha, Venkumamba and Master Venkateshwar were cast in key supporting roles. Kamaraju appeared as Emperor Babur, and Mikkilineni made a brief appearance as Ramakrishna's relative Kanakaraju.

Viswanathan–Ramamoorthy were signed to compose the soundtrack and background score for both the versions. Ranga's brother-in-law B. N. Haridas worked as the cinematographer. However, Ranga was credited as the film's director of photography with Haridas. P. G. Mohan edited the film. Vali and Ganga were the art directors, and V. K. Srinivasan was the film's production manager. Chopra and Gopalakrishnan choreographed the dance sequences.

Music 
Viswanathan–Ramamoorthy composed the soundtrack and background score, with Samudrala penning the lyrics for the songs and poems. Ghantasala, Madhavapeddi Satyam, P. Leela, P. Susheela, Balasaraswathi and A. P. Komala were the soundtrack's playback singers. Bhanumathi provided vocals as the playback singer for the songs featuring her. The song "Chesedi Yemito" was composed using the Sindhu Bhairavi raga. "Neevega Raja Neevega" and "Jhan Jhan Kankanamulu" are based on the Shanmukhapriya and Shuddha Saveri ragas. The song "Chandana Charchita", an ashtapadi adapted from Gita Govinda written by the Sanskrit poet Jayadeva, was composed using the Mohanam raga. When Ghantasala refused to take money for the 14 poems he sang, Ranga went to his home and gave his wife Savithri Ghantasala one hundred rupees for each poem. Ramakoti, who played a washer man in the film, sang the song "Akathayipilla Mooka".

The soundtrack, marketed by HMV Records, was released on 1 December 1956. The songs received positive reviews from the critics after the film's release. A review dated 27 January 1956 in Swatantra said: "The songs help the film greatly, with all the singers performing very well, though the ones sung by Bhanumathi could have been much better[sic]". The reviewer also found the background score "generally effective", and "exceptional" at times. Zameen Raithu, in its review dated 10 February 1956, praised Samudrala for adapting Jayadeva's ashtapadi and other complicated poems and not "compromising" for the common audience to understand. However, the reviewer was critical of the grammatical and pronunciation errors made by the singers and actors in the film. The songs "Theerani Naa Korikale", "Chandana Charchita", "Jhan Jhan Kankanamulu" and "Gandupilli Menumarachi" gained popularity post release.

Track listing

Release 
Navayuga films distributed the film in the Vijayawada, Guntakal, and Madras areas. The Nizam area distribution rights were acquired by All India Corporation Limited. Due to technical issues, the film had a delayed theatrical release on 13 and 14 January 1956 in 13 centres across Telangana and Andhra Pradesh. Tenali Raman was released on 3 February 1956, with both the versions being commercially successful.

Reception 
The film received mixed reviews from critics. Swatantra, in its review dated 27 January 1956, wrote that the film was paced evenly until the end, and Samudrala's writing was one of the biggest strengths of the film. The reviewer praised Nageswara Rao's performance and dialogue delivery, but was critical of Rama Rao and Bhanumathi, noting that the latter was very "ill at ease" playing Krishnasani which was "surprising" given that the role was in her comfort zone. Zameen Raithu gave a negative review, writing that the film was disappointing and criticised the climax as the film's weakest link. In its review dated 10 February 1956, Zameen Raithu wrote that Ranga has a great vision which cannot be ignored, and an eye for subtle and innuendo-free comedy, calling Samudrala's writing and screenplay praiseworthy. The reviewer added that the characterisations were ill-developed, with Rama Rao and Nageswara Rao salvaging the film to an extent, though Bhanumathi struggled in portraying the grey shades with authenticity.

The film was also criticised for being historically inaccurate. Swatantra noted that Ramakrishna is given credit for solving the problem of distributing 17 disputed elephants among three brothers, though this was actually done by Timmarusu. Zameen Raithu was very critical of the portrayal of Ramakrishna as a staunch Sri Vaishnavite, while he was a Telugu Shaivite Brahmin with the alternate name Ramalinga. The reviewer noted that the depiction of the clean-shaven Ramakrishna, a 6000 Niyogi Brahmin by birth, was inaccurate for the period as Niyogis always sported a moustache in the 14th century.

Accolades 
Tenali Ramakrishna won the President's Silver medal for the Best Feature Film in Telugu and the All India Certificate of Merit for Best Feature Film at the 4th National Film Awards. The film was the second South Indian film to win the All India Certificate of Merit for Best Feature Film.

Remake 
Tenali Ramakrishna was remade by Ranga into the Kannada language again in 1982 as Hasyaratna Ramakrishna, starring Anant Nag and Srinath as Ramakrishna and Krishnadevaraya. Unlike the original, the remake was a commercial failure  with critics specifying that the audience did not accept Ramakrishna dominating Krishnadevaraya throughout the film.

Notes

References

External links 
 

1950s Telugu-language films
1956 films
Best Telugu Feature Film National Film Award winners
Films directed by B. S. Ranga
Films set in ancient India
Films set in the Vijayanagara Empire
Indian biographical films
Indian black-and-white films
1950s historical comedy films
Indian films based on plays
Indian historical comedy-drama films
Indian multilingual films
Telugu films remade in other languages
Films scored by Viswanathan–Ramamoorthy
Tenali Rama
1950s biographical drama films
1950s multilingual films
1956 comedy films